The Temotu whistler (Pachycephala vanikorensis) is a species of bird in the family Pachycephalidae, which is endemic to the Santa Cruz Islands of the Solomon Islands group. It was classified as a separate species in 2016 by the IOC. Two of its subspecies (P. v. ornate and utupuae) belonged previously to the former  white-throated whistler and the nominate subspecies was a subspecies of the Melanesian Whistler.

Taxonomy and systematics
It was variably considered as subspecies of a widespread golden whistler (Pachycephala pectoralis).

Subspecies
Three subspecies are recognized:
 P. v. ornata - Mayr, 1932: Found on northern Santa Cruz Islands
 P. v. utupuae - Mayr, 1932: Formerly described as a separate species. Found on Utupua (central Santa Cruz Islands)
 P. v. vanikorensis - Oustalet 1875: Found on Vanikoro (southern Santa Cruz Islands)

References

Temotu whistler
Birds of the Santa Cruz Islands
Temotu whistler